Kristopher Colt Morton (born April 10, 1982) is an American former Major League Baseball catcher who played for the San Diego Padres.

Amateur career
While attending high school at The King's Academy in West Palm Beach, Florida, Morton lettered in baseball and led the team with a .339 batting average, eight home runs, and 26 RBI as a senior. He was a two-time All-State honoree, a preseason Louisville Slugger/TPX High School All-American, and received an All-American honorable mention from Collegiate Baseball for his efforts.

He attended North Carolina State University in Raleigh, North Carolina, and in 2002 he played collegiate summer baseball with the Chatham A's of the Cape Cod Baseball League. He was selected by the Padres in the third round of the 2003 MLB Draft.

Professional career
He made his major league debut for the Padres in 2007, appearing in one game. He appeared in nine more games for the team the following season.

References

External links

1982 births
Living people
Arizona League Padres players
Chatham Anglers players
Eugene Emeralds players
Fort Wayne Wizards players
Lake Elsinore Storm players
Major League Baseball catchers
Baseball players from Fort Lauderdale, Florida
Mobile BayBears players
NC State Wolfpack baseball players
North Carolina State University alumni
Portland Beavers players
San Antonio Missions players
San Diego Padres players
West Tennessee Diamond Jaxx players
Sugar Land Skeeters players